Suffolk Police may refer to:

Suffolk Constabulary, East Anglia, England
Suffolk County Sheriff's Department, in Massachusetts
Suffolk County Police Department, in New York